The Congregational Church (also known as the United Church of Christ) is a historic church building in Berlin, New Hampshire.  Built in 1882, it was the community's first church building, and is a prominent local example of Stick/Eastlake Victorian architecture.  The building was listed on the National Register of Historic Places in 1980.  The congregation is affiliated with the United Church of Christ.

Architecture and history
Berlin's Congregational Church stands north of its downtown area, on the west side of Main Street at its southern junction with Maple Street.  It is a basically rectangular single-story wood-frame structure, with a steeply pitched gable roof.  Its exterior is clad in a combination of wooden clapboards, shingles, and applied Stick-style woodwork.  A gabled projection extends to the left side near the rear, and a multi-stage rectangular tower rises from the left front corner.  The tower has narrow windows (arched in the Gothic style on the second level), with an open belfry topped by a pyramidal roof with flared eave.  The belfry openings have arched woodwork and low balustrades.  A shed-roof shelter extends across the front of the main facade between the tower and a projecting gabled secondary entrance; the main entrance is in the base of the tower under a bracketed hood.

Berlin's Congregationalist congregation first organized in 1836, when a Sunday School was established, and the first settled minister was hired the following year.  The congregation first met in private spaces (typically homes or barns), until 1852, when the owners of the H. Winslow store made their upstairs hall available for services.  The present church, the community's first dedicated church building, was built in 1882 on land donated by the Berlin Mills Company.

See also
National Register of Historic Places listings in Coos County, New Hampshire

References

United Church of Christ churches in New Hampshire
Congregational churches in New Hampshire
Churches on the National Register of Historic Places in New Hampshire
Queen Anne architecture in New Hampshire
Churches completed in 1882
19th-century United Church of Christ church buildings
Churches in Coös County, New Hampshire
National Register of Historic Places in Coös County, New Hampshire
Churches in Berlin, New Hampshire